Karla Runkehl (7 November 1930 - 24 December 1986) was an East German actress. She appeared in more than forty films from 1950 to 1986.

Selected filmography

References

External links 

1930 births
1986 deaths
German film actresses
Actors from Szczecin